Life on Display is the second studio album by post-grunge band Puddle of Mudd. It was produced by John Kurzweg whose previous work includes Creed, Socialburn, and No Address, and whom produced the band's previous album, and Michael "Elvis" Baskette.

In contrast to their previous album, Come Clean, Life on Display was a commercial disappointment, only being certified Gold by the RIAA, in comparison to Come Clean's triple platinum success. To date, Life on Display has sold 706,191 units in the United States.

The album received generally negative reviews, and peaked at #20 on the Billboard 200 album chart, spending 23 weeks on the chart. It was less successful internationally on the charts.

The album spawned one hit single, "Away from Me", which reached #1 on the Mainstream Rock Tracks. Two additional minor hits, "Spin You Around" and "Heel Over Head," charted on the U.S. Mainstream Rock and Alternative charts. All three singles had corresponding music videos.

History
Puddle of Mudd began writing material for the second album while on tour for their first in 2002. 18 songs were recorded for the record. The band spent over 8 months in various studios recording the material. Singer Scantlin had to learn new chord progression for the track, "Time Flies." A B-Side song entitled, "Bleed" was loaned for the movie, The Punisher. An unreleased song called "Galvanic" garnered some attention due to the fact Scantlin cried during playback for it.

Promotion
The "Away from Me" video was featured during the 10th season of Making the Video. Puddle of Mudd also performed four tracks off the album on the November 25 debut episode of Fuse TV's 7th Avenue Drop. "Nothing Left to Lose" served as the main theme song for WWE's Royal Rumble 2004. Also went as one of the soundtrack of the famous TV series The O.C.

Critical reception

Initial critical response to Life on Display was generally unfavorable. At Metacritic, which assigns a normalized rating out of 100 to reviews from mainstream critics, the album has received an average score of 37, based on seven reviews. Life on Display received largely average to poor reviews from Entertainment Weekly, E Online, and Allmusic. Christian Hoard of Rolling Stone gave the album a mere 1 out of 5 stars, citing "the predominant emotion transmitted by these tired, hookless tunes is a kind of skull-banging numbness."

Track listing

Personnel
Wesley Scantlin – lead vocals, rhythm guitar
Paul Phillips – lead guitar
Doug Ardito – bass, backing vocals
Greg Upchurch – drums
Bill McGathy – tambourine
Peter Katsis – triangle
Ian Montone – triangle

Production
John Kurzweg – executive producer, engineer
Andy Wallace – mixing

Charts and certifications

Weekly charts

Year-end charts

Certifications

References

External links
 

2003 albums
Puddle of Mudd albums
Geffen Records albums